Cyathopoma is a genus of land snails with an operculum, a terrestrial gastropod mollusks in the family Cyclophoridae.

Species
Species within the genus Cyathopoma include:
 
 Cyathopoma africanum Pilsbry, 1919
 Cyathopoma album Beddome, 1875
 Cyathopoma ambanianae Emberton, 2003
 Cyathopoma ambatovakiae Emberton, 2003
 Cyathopoma ambrense Emberton, 2003
 Cyathopoma anamallayanum Beddome, 1875
 Cyathopoma andapae Emberton, 2003
 Cyathopoma anjombona  K. C. Emberton, Slapcinsky, Campbell, Rakotondrazafy, Andriamiarison & J. D. Emberton, 2010  
 Cyathopoma antsirarakaense ( Fischer-Piette, Blanc, C.P., Blanc, F. & Salvat, 1993)
 Cyathopoma artatum Sykes, 1897
 Cyathopoma atrosetosum Beddome, 1875
 Cyathopoma avoa Emberton, 2003
 Cyathopoma azaniense Verdcourt, 1978
 Cyathopoma beampingaratrae Emberton, 2003
 Cyathopoma beddomeanum Nevill, 1881
 Cyathopoma bemahalevonae Emberton, 2003
 Cyathopoma bemarahae Emberton, 2003
 Cyathopoma betamponae Emberton, 2003
 Cyathopoma bevavatsotra Emberton, 2003
 Cyathopoma biangulatum Emberton, 2003
 Cyathopoma bikatsara Emberton, 2003
 Cyathopoma blanfordi H. Adams, 1868
 Cyathopoma camerunense de Winter, 2002
 Cyathopoma celestinae Emberton, 2003
 Cyathopoma ceylanicum Beddome, 1875
 Cyathopoma chirindae (van Bruggen, 1986)
 Cyathopoma colleti Sykes, 1898
 Cyathopoma conoideum Sykes, 1898
 Cyathopoma coonoorense W. T. Blanford, 1868
 Cyathopoma cornu Möllendorff, 1891
 Cyathopoma damoclesi Emberton, 1994
 Cyathopoma deccanense W. T. Blanford, 1868
 Cyathopoma delicatum Emberton, 2003
 Cyathopoma dickoyense (Beddome, 1875)
 Cyathopoma diegoense Fischer-Piette, Blanc, F. & Vukadinovic, 1974
 Cyathopoma duboisi  Fischer-Piette, Blanc, C.P., Blanc, F. & Salvat, 1993
 Cyathopoma elatum Beddome, 1875
 Cyathopoma faravoriae Emberton, 2003
 Cyathopoma filocinctum (Benson, 1851)
 Cyathopoma franzhuberi Thach, 2020
 Cyathopoma garoense Godwin-Austen, 1876
 Cyathopoma griffithsi Emberton, 2003
 Cyathopoma hoditra  K. C. Emberton, Slapcinsky, Campbell, Rakotondrazafy, Andriamiarison & J. D. Emberton, 2010  
 Cyathopoma huberi Thach, 2018
 Cyathopoma imperforatum Nevill, 1881
 Cyathopoma inexspectatum G. Holyoak & D. Holyoak, 2020
 Cyathopoma innocens Sykes, 1899
 Cyathopoma iridescens K. C. Emberton, Slapcinsky, Campbell, Rakotondrazafy, Andriamiarison & J. D. Emberton, 2010  
 Cyathopoma iva Emberton, 2003
 Cyathopoma jawaiense Godwin-Austen, 1876
 Cyathopoma josephinae Emberton, 2003
 Cyathopoma kalryenense  (W. T. & H. F. Blanford, 1861)
 Cyathopoma kelirusteri Emberton, 2003
 Cyathopoma kianjavatoae Emberton, 2003
 Cyathopoma kolamulliense  (W. T. & H. F. Blanford, 1861)
 Cyathopoma lasavava Emberton, 2003
 Cyathopoma latilabre Beddome, 1875
 Cyathopoma lava Emberton, 2003
 Cyathopoma lavabea Emberton, 2003
 Cyathopoma leptomitum Sykes, 1898
 Cyathopoma madio K. C. Emberton, Slapcinsky, Campbell, Rakotondrazafy, Andriamiarison & J. D. Emberton, 2010  
 Cyathopoma magnificum Emberton, 2003
 Cyathopoma mahafinaritra Emberton, 2003
 Cyathopoma mahagaga Emberton, 2003
 Cyathopoma mahalevonae Emberton, 2003
 Cyathopoma maherivava Emberton, 2003
 Cyathopoma majungae ( Fischer-Piette, Blanc, C.P., Blanc, F. & Salvat, 1993)
 Cyathopoma malabaricum (W. T. Blanford & H. F. Blanford, 1860)
 Cyathopoma mariae Jousseaume, 1894
 Cyathopoma marojejiae Emberton, 2003
 Cyathopoma masoalae Emberton, 2003
 Cyathopoma matsoko K. C. Emberton, Slapcinsky, Campbell, Rakotondrazafy, Andriamiarison & J. D. Emberton, 2010  
 Cyathopoma meredithae (van Bruggen, 1983)
 Cyathopoma miakatra Emberton, 2003
 Cyathopoma miaranoniae Emberton, 2003
 Cyathopoma michellae Emberton, 2003
 Cyathopoma micronicum Yen, 1948
 Cyathopoma mirehareda Emberton, 2003
 Cyathopoma molotra Emberton, 2003
 Cyathopoma natalicium Godwin-Austen, 1895
 Cyathopoma nevilli Godwin-Austen, 1876
 Cyathopoma nishinoi  Minato, 1980
 Cyathopoma nitidum Beddome, 1875
 Cyathopoma nosymangabe Emberton, 2003
 Cyathopoma ogdenianum Preston, 1909
 Cyathopoma onjavava Emberton, 2003
 Cyathopoma orchida Emberton, 2003
 Cyathopoma ovatum Beddome, 1875
 Cyathopoma pauliani  Salvat, 1968
 Cyathopoma pearcei Emberton, 2003
 Cyathopoma peilei Preston, 1903
 Cyathopoma pembense Rowson, 2010
 Cyathopoma perconoideum Preston, 1909
 Cyathopoma picardense Gerlach, 2006
 Cyathopoma picbobyi Emberton, 2003
 Cyathopoma planorboides Yen, 1948
 Cyathopoma platorchida Emberton, 2003
 Cyathopoma prestoni Sykes, 1897
 Cyathopoma procerum W. T. Blanford, 1868
 Cyathopoma pygmaeum Emberton, 2003
 Cyathopoma randalana Emberton & Pearce, 1999
 Cyathopoma ranomafanae Emberton, 1994
 Cyathopoma rusteri  Fischer-Piette, Blanc, C.P., Blanc, F. & Salvat, 1993
 Cyathopoma ruthae Emberton, 2003
 Cyathopoma sahalalava Emberton, 2003
 Cyathopoma saintemariae Emberton, 2003
 Cyathopoma serendibense Preston, 1903
 Cyathopoma shevaroyanum Beddome, 1875
 Cyathopoma sivagherrianum Beddome, 1875
 Cyathopoma straeleni Fischer-Piette, Blanc, C.P., Blanc, F. & Salvat, 1993
 Cyathopoma taiwanicum Pilsbry & Hirase, 1905
 Cyathopoma tataka Emberton, 2003
 Cyathopoma tignarium Benson, 1863
 Cyathopoma travancoricum Beddome, 1875
 Cyathopoma tres van Bruggen, 2008
 Cyathopoma trochlea van Bruggen, 2008
 Cyathopoma tsaratananae Emberton, 2003
 Cyathopoma turbinatum Sykes, 1897
 Cyathopoma uncopercula (Emberton, 1994)
 Cyathopoma uvaense Preston, 1909
 Cyathopoma vasoloae Emberton, 2003
 Cyathopoma vavatsotra Emberton, 2003
 Cyathopoma vitreum Beddome, 1875
 Cyathopoma waterloti Fischer-Piette, Blanc, F. & Vukadinovic, 1974
 Cyathopoma wynaadense W. T. Blanford, 1868

References

Seashells-Landsnails-Freshwater Shells. 3 New Genera, 132 New Species & Subspecies, p. 173 pp

External links
 Blanford W. T. & Blanford H. F. (1861). Contributions to Indian malacology, No. II. The Journal of the Asiatic Society of Bengal. 30(4): 347-366, pl. 1-2
 Kobelt W. (1902). Das Tierreich. Eine Zusammenstellung und Kennzeichnung der rezenten Tierformen. 16. Lieferung. Mollusca. Cyclophoridae. Das Tierreich. XXXIX + 662 pp., 1 map.
 Pilsbry, H.A. (1919). A review of the land mollusks of the Belgian Congo chiefly based on the collections of the American Museum Congo Expedition, 1909-1915. Bulletin of the American Museum of Natural History, 40: 1-370, pls I-XXIII.

Cyclophoridae
Taxonomy articles created by Polbot